Oleksandr Okhrimenko is a search and rescue ship of the Naval Forces of Armed Forces of Ukraine.

History
Oleksandr Okhrimenko, a Project 2262 search and rescue ship, was built by Keppel Fels shipyard for the USSR. The ship was launched in 1987 as Svetlomor-4.

In late 1992 the ship was assigned to the Black Sea Shipping Company's expeditionary search and rescue group. In 2012 the ship was renamed Оleksandr Okhrimenko being reassigned to the state (treasury) company Maritime Emergency and Rescue Service (МАРС). Later it belonged to the Seaports Administration of Ukraine.

In 2016 the Seaports Administration ran a tender to find a contractor to rebuild the ship. The winner was Millenium Maritime, LLC, pledging to repair the vessel at a cost of UAH 49 mln. The Seaports Administration transferred funds with the exception of the few millions that were acknowledged missing.

Millenium Maritime, LLC sued the Seaports Administration for UAH 3 mln winning the case.

Finally, in December 2018 Solomyanskyi court in Kyiv removed the attachment from the ship to dispose it to the Ukrainian Navy.

The ship was formally disposed to the Ukrainian Navy from the Ministry of Infrastructure on August 29, 2019.

The ship appeared on the horizon at 15.30 and at 17:20 was moored at Pivdenna Naval Base, Praktychna harbor.

On November 13 2019, solemn events on the occasion of the transfer of the search and rescue vessel to the Ukrainian Navy took place in Odessa.

References

Marine salvage
1987 ships
Ships of the Ukrainian Navy